The Paris 1878 chess tournament took place from 17 June to 31 July 1878 during the Paris World Expo. The participation of George Henry Mackenzie and James Mason made it the first intercontinental tournament in Europe. Eleven double rounds were played. Wilhelm Steinitz was present as reporter for The Field.

First place was shared by Szymon Winawer and Johannes Hermann Zukertort, who had a play-off to decide the winner. They drew twice, so another play-off was necessary. Zukertort won both games and was awarded first prize. Mackenzie defeated Henry Edward Bird twice in the play-off for the fourth place.

The win of Zukertort, and non-participation of Steinitz, led to some suggestion that Zukertort should be called World Chess Champion.

Winners of the prizes were: Zukertort (1000 Frans + two Sèvres vases), Winawer (500 F + one vase), Joseph Henry Blackburne (1500 F), Mackenzie (1000 F), Bird (500 F), and Adolf Anderssen (200 F). Anderssen was in poor health and died the next year.

The results and standings:

{|class="wikitable" style="margin: 1em auto 1em auto; "
|  style="background:#f0f0f0;"|#
|  style="background:#f0f0f0;"|Player
|  style="background:#f0f0f0;"|1
|  style="background:#f0f0f0;"|2
|  style="background:#f0f0f0;"|3
|  style="background:#f0f0f0;"|4
|  style="background:#f0f0f0;"|5
|  style="background:#f0f0f0;"|6
|  style="background:#f0f0f0;"|7
|  style="background:#f0f0f0;"|8
|  style="background:#f0f0f0;"|9
|  style="background:#f0f0f0;"|10
|  style="background:#f0f0f0;"|11
|  style="background:#f0f0f0;"|12
|  style="background:#f0f0f0;"|Total
|-
|1 ||  ||x ||1 0 ||½ ½ ||0 ½ ||1 1 ||½ 1 ||0 1 ||1 1 ||½ 1 ||1 1 ||1 1 ||1 1 ||16.5  
|- 
|2 ||  ||0 1 ||x ||1 0 ||½ 0 ||1 1 ||1 ½ ||½ ½ ||1 1 ||1 1 ||½ 1 ||1 1 ||1 1 ||16.5 
|-
|3 ||  ||½ ½ ||0 1 ||x ||0 1 ||1 0 ||0 0 ||1 ½ ||1 ½ ||1 1 ||1 ½ ||1 1 ||1 1 ||14.5	
|- 
|4 ||  ||1 ½ ||½ 1 ||1 0 ||x ||0 1 ||0 0 ||0 1 ||½ 0 ||0 1 ||1 1 ||1 1 ||1 ½ ||13.0 
|-
|5 ||  ||0 0 ||0 0 ||0 1 ||1 0 ||x ||1 1 ||1 0 ||1 0 ||0 1 ||1 1 ||1 1 ||1 1 ||13.0	
|- 
|6 ||  ||½ 0 ||0 ½ ||1 1 ||1 1 ||0 0 ||x ||1 0 ||0 ½ ||1 1 ||1 0 ||1 0 ||1 1 ||12.5   
|-
|7 ||  ||1 0 ||½ ½ ||0 ½ ||1 0 ||0 1 ||0 1 ||x ||½ ½ ||0 1 ||½ ½ ||1 1 ||1 0 ||11.5	
|- 
|8 ||  ||0 0 ||0 0 ||0 ½ ||½ 1 ||0 1 ||1 ½ ||½ ½ ||x ||0 1 ||1 0 ||1 1 ||1 1 ||11.5 
|-
|9 ||  ||½ 0 ||0 0 ||0 0 ||1 0 ||1 0 ||0 0 ||1 0 ||1 0 ||x ||0 1 ||1 0 ||1 1 ||8.5	
|- 
|10 ||  ||0 0 ||½ 0 ||0 ½ ||0 0 ||0 0 ||0 1 ||½ ½ ||0 1 ||1 0 ||x ||1 1 ||1 ½ ||8.5 
|-
|11 ||   ||0 0 ||0 0 ||0 0 ||0 0 ||0 0 ||0 1 ||0 0 ||0 0 ||0 1 ||0 0 ||x ||1 ½ ||3.5	
|- 
|12 ||  ||0 0 ||0 0 ||0 0 ||0 ½ ||0 0 ||0 0 ||0 1 ||0 0 ||0 0 ||0 ½ ||0 ½ ||x ||2.5 
|}

References

Chess competitions
1878 in chess
Chess in Paris
1870s in Paris
1878 in France
June 1878 sports events
July 1878 sports events